Limestone is a ghost Town located in Stillwater County, Montana, United States.

The elevation is 5,535 feet. Limestone appears on the Meyer Mountain U.S. Geological Survey Map.

History

Limestone was a mining community situated along Lodgepole Creek and sat at the foot of Limestone Butte, for which the town was named. The town was small but busy. The post office operated at Limestone from 1910 to 1953. Today Limestone is a ghost town with a number of buildings left standing, including the former grocery store and post office.

References

Former populated places in Stillwater County, Montana
Ghost towns in Montana